Bolesław Domański (*1872 in Przytarnia (Wildau), near Konitz, West Prussia - † 1939, Berlin, Germany) was a famous Polish Catholic priest, chief of the Union of Poles in Germany. In the years 1903–1939 he was a parson of Zakrzewo parish. Domański was a fighter for the rights of the Polish minority in Grenzmark Posen-West Prussia, at the time a Prussian province on the border of Germany and Poland, as well as for the rights of Polish emigrants in the Ruhr area.

1872 births
1939 deaths
20th-century Polish Roman Catholic priests
Catholic clergy of the Prussian partition
People from Kościerzyna County